Frederick George Hamlin (18 April 1881 – 7 April 1951) was a British cyclist. He competed in two events at the 1908 Summer Olympics. He won a silver medal in the men's tandem.

References

External links
 

1881 births
1951 deaths
British male cyclists
Olympic cyclists of Great Britain
Cyclists at the 1908 Summer Olympics
Olympic silver medallists for Great Britain
Olympic medalists in cycling
People from Barking, London
Cyclists from Greater London
Medalists at the 1908 Summer Olympics
20th-century British people